Nina Hynes is an Irish musician and music producer from Dublin, Republic of Ireland.
She releases music through her own label Transplant Records on www.ninahynes.bandcamp.com/ and also privately to subscribers.

Music career
Nina made her music debut in 1999 with the release of the EP 'Creation' on Reverb Records. Nina had several successful tours of North America  and won the support of Nic Harcourt at KCRW, among others. Following her first LP the 2002 release 'Staros' on Reverb Records  her successful single release 'Mono Prix' granted her success in her native Republic of Ireland.

She has gained considerable success in the European underground music scene most notable in Ireland, Czech Republic and Slovakia this popularity broadened through extensive touring with her band 'Nina Hynes and The Husbands' throughout 2002 to 2008. She toured extensively in the U.S. from 1999 to 2002. 
At an early age, she toured with experimental composers Hector Zazou and Brian Eno collaborator Harold Budd.
Jane Birkin and Melanie Gabriel covered Nina’s songs on Hector Zazou's album Strong Currents. She sang on the 2009 Abbey Rd. Children in Need single ‘All you need is love’ by The Beatles and singing on ‘My Favorite Things’ from The Sound of Music for CIN album.

Nina Hynes first released her debut album in 2002 'Staros' to critical acclaim in her native Ireland and with some recognition in the UK. Her second album was released in 2007 'Really Really Do'. She has appeared on RTÉ's Other Voices, No Disco and The View. A few months after the album's release, the money promised from the label for promotion failed to materialise so Nina left the label and her then manager Michael Fitzgerald(also head of Reverb Records).

She has been a member of Art Music Collectives A=Apple, Sending Letters to the Sea and A Generous Act and has collaborated with many musicians.
In 2010, she had a musical residency at The Mattress Factory museum, Pittsburgh and took part in a collaborative album as part of A Generous Act collective.  She has played support to Roxy Music, Stereolab, Smog, David Gray, The Swell Season, The Frames, Joan as a Police Woman, Cat Power, Damien Rice.
She toured Europe with Irish artist Glen Hansard in the fall of 2019.

After giving birth to her first child in 2008, Nina didn't tour or release until 2011 when she put out a new track called 'In A Million'. The same year, she launched her Fund It campaign which give fans the opportunity to help finance the fourth studio album. The album was later recorded in Celbridge in Kildare, Brussels and Berlin. Nina was successful in securing finance for the LP through this initiative. in April, 2013 her fourth studio album 'Goldmine' was released as a download only through her own record label Transplant Records for two weeks. The album is a collaboration with Fabien Leseure both artists, along with collaborator Sean Carpio appear under the band name 'Dancing Suns'.

In 2018, she finished  her first feature film soundtrack for a film called 'Glue' directed by Irish artist Oisin' Byrne in collaboration with Gary Farrelly. She is currently working on a new soundtrack to a road movie called 'Aimer La Vie' for French first-time Director Nadia Genet.
She regularly collaborates making sound works and soundtracks for visual and installation artists.

In 2019, Nina did her second successful crowdfunding and set up her own studio to self-record and produce a new album. 
This album ZAP! is due for release in 2020.
She regularly releases new material for a small and loyal fanbase.

Since 2007, she resides in Berlin, Germany with her two children.

Music videos
Rain (2013)
Dancing Suns Live at Funkhaus (2013)
Tarnished (2013)
Sewing Machine
Cuckoo (2011), directed by Maarten J. Boer
Mono Prix (2002) 
Zhivago Blue (2002) 
William Tell (2000) 
Lulu Mae (2007), directed by Jason Hickey and Jimmy Behan 
Somewhere Out There (2008), directed by Graeme Pearce
Christmas Time is Here (2010)
Go (2020), directed by Neil Dowling

Discography
Albums/EPs

 Creation (1999)
 Can I Sleep Now?(2001)
 Staros (2002)
 Honeymood (2004)
 Really Really Do (2007)
 Goldmine (2013)
 Raging Fire (2017)
 Sanctuary(2017)
 Songs form the lockdown(2020)

Singles

 Universal / This Magic Stuff (2002)
 Mono Prix                    (2002)
 Road Relish                  (2002)
 Honeymood                    (2004)
 Flutter And Wow              (2006)
 Fitness / Somewhere Out There(2007)
 In A Million                 (2011)
 Dancing Suns                 (2013)
 Unfuck The World             (2019)
 Rabbit Hole                  (2019)
 Vulva                        (2020)

Collaborations
 Vocals on Magda's live sets from the band Blotter Trax(Release TBC)(2019-2020)
 Vocals on "A Place For The Other" and "From One To Ten" from the Array album "First World Power Conference" (2006)
 Vocals on "Deeper Than Heaven" from the Jimmy Behan album "Days Are What We Live In" (2004)
 Vocals on "Under My Wing" from the Hector Zazou album "Strong Currents" (2003)
 Vocals on "So New" with Cillian Murphy for Disco Pigs Soundtrack (2001)
 Vocals on "No Bagsies, No Keepsies" from the Messiah J & The Expert album "Now This I Have To Hear" (2006)
 Vocals on "On The Skyline" and "Dorothy Goes Home" from the Super Extra Bonus Party album "Super Extra Bonus Party" (2007)
 Vocals on "Twinkle" from the compilation "An Indiecater Christmas" (2008)

References

External links
Nina's official Bandcamp page

Year of birth missing (living people)
Living people
Irish expatriates in Germany
Irish women singers
Musicians from Dublin (city)